The 2000 Vermont Democratic presidential primary took place on March 7, 2000 to select the state's 15 pledged delegates to the 2000 Democratic National Convention. Several other states held their primary concurrently on the day of the Vermont primary as part of Super Tuesday. 

Al Gore won the primary and earned a majority of the state's pledged delegates.

Results

References

Notes

Vermont
Democratic
Vermont Democratic primaries